Flylab Srl is an Italian light aircraft manufacturer based in Ischitella, Foggia.

Flylab produce a range of variants of the basic Flylab Tucano (toucan) model. Their offerings include the popular Tucano basic model, the improved Tucano V, its amphibious version Tucano HV, the budget Tucano Delta3 (Deltatre), the amphibious Tucano HD3 and HD3A and the twin-engined Tucano Delta3 TW and Delta3 VTW. With a cost of slightly less than €11,000, the Tucano Delta3 is one of the cheapest ready to fly ultralights available on the market.

References

External links

 Official website
 Tucano a/c photos from JetPhotos.net
 Tucano Delta3 test by Aviazione Leggera On Line

Ultralight aircraft